Dundonald is a large settlement and civil parish in County Down, Northern Ireland. It lies east of Belfast and is often considered a suburb of the city. It is home to the Ulster Hospital, Dundonald International Ice Bowl, Dundonald Omnipark (Cinema and various eateries), has a Park and Ride facility for the Glider (Belfast Rapid Transit system), access to the Comber Greenway and several housing developments. 
John de Courcey established a keep including a motte-and-bailey in the 12th century. This is known as Moat Park and can be accessed from Church Green, Comber Road and the Upper Newtownards Road.

History 
Dundonald refers to a 12th-century Norman fort, or Dún, Dún Dónaill, that stood in the town. One of the largest in Ireland, the man-made hill that the fort stood on is still in existence.

Although the mound is commonly referred to as 'the moat' this is, in fact, a corruption of the word 'motte' and refers to the fact that this defensive structure was built in the style of a motte and bailey. St. Elizabeth's Church is located beside the moat, with the Cleland Mausoleum in the adjacent graveyard.

Dundonald acquired rail links to Belfast and Newtownards in 1850, Downpatrick in 1859 and Newcastle in 1869. The town was located on the once extensive Belfast and County Down Railway mainline. The rail link with Belfast encouraged Dundonald to expand as a commuter town, but in 1950 the railway line running through Dundonald was closed. Dundonald railway station was opened on 6 May 1850, but finally closed on 24 April 1950.
The old railway line has now been converted to the Comber greenway, a pedestrian path running from East Belfast, through Dundonald to Comber. In the 1960s, Dundonald was deemed a small village. Over the last 10 years Dundonald has seen a spike in housing developments, given its proximity to Belfast, Bangor, Stormont and Ballyhackamore.

Demography 
For census purposes, Dundonald is not treated as a separate entity by the NI Statistics and Research Agency (NISRA). Instead, it is combined with a large part of east and southeast Belfast to form the "Castlereagh Urban Area". A fairly accurate population count can be found by combining the data of the electoral wards that make up Dundonald. These wards are Ballyhanwood 1, Carrowreagh, Dundonald, Enler, and Grahams Bridge. However, the wards also include part of the countryside surrounding Dundonald.

On the day of the last census (27 March 2011), the combined population of these wards was 16,098
. This is within the bounds of the medium-sized town (a population between 10,000 and 18,000).

Of this population:
71.3% were Protestant or from a Protestant background
3.6% were Catholic or from a Catholic background
25.1% were of other religious backgrounds or no religious background.

Governance
Dundonald is represented in council governance by the Castlereagh East DEA. The members elected in 2019 were:

Townlands 
Dundonald sprang up within the small parish of the same name. Like the rest of Ireland, this parish has long been divided into townlands, whose names mostly come from the Irish language. Over time, more rural townlands have been built upon and they have given their names to many roads and housing estates. The following is a list of townlands within Dundonald's urban area, alongside their likely etymologies:
Ballybeen 
Ballymiscaw 
Ballyoran 
Ballyregan
Carrowreagh 
Dunlady

Places of interest 

The Comber Greenway is a direct traffic free link into Belfast and it passes through Dundonald. It is enjoyed by thousands of cyclists and walkers on a daily basis.

Hillhead Road, Tattletale Strangler residence.

In 1986, The Dundonald International Ice Bowl was opened in the town. This originally comprised an Olympic sized ice rink and a 20 lane AMF ten pin bowling alley. In later years, "Indianaland", a children's Aztec themed indoor adventure playground was added along with Laser Quest, a simulated combat arena using laser tag equipment. The bowling alley was upgraded to 30 lanes in the 1990s and an extensive miniature golf course was built. The site also contains a David Lloyd fitness centre. In 2006, the area was designated as the Dundonald Leisure Park, as part of the Draft Belfast Metropolitan Area Plan 2015. In 2008, an Omniplex cinema was built on the opposite side of the Old Dundonald Road, together with several leisure and restaurant units, which later on now became what is now known as the OmniPark.

The Ulster Hospital is located in Dundonald, known colloquially as "The Ulster".

Sport 
A number of local association football teams play out of Dundonald, Dundonald F.C. playing in 1C and 3C of the Northern Amateur Football League and  "Moat Park Rangers" and "43RD Old Boys" playing in the Down Area Winter Football League are the three clubs that are well known in the town. Dundonald Football Club is one of the oldest running amateur league clubs in Northern Ireland, established in 1953.

Dundonald has seen two football teams fold, Donard Hospital F.C. and St. Elizabeth's F.C.

The town's ice rink, the Dundonald Ice Bowl is home to the Irish Ice Hockey League's Junior Belfast Giants.

Ards motor racing Circuit  

The Ards Circuit through Dundonald was a motorsport street circuit used for RAC Tourist Trophy sports car races from 1928 until 1936. At the time, it was Northern Ireland's premier sporting event, regularly attracting crowds in excess of a quarter of a million people.

The pits at Dundonald were still visible until the 1960s. A popular viewing point for the Dundonald Hairpin Bend was the Central Bar in Dundonald.

Education 
Dundonald accommodates two primary schools, Dundonald Primary School and Brooklands Primary School.

Dundonald serves a secondary education school, Dundonald High School. Dundonald also has two schools for those with special needs and learning difficulties, Tor Bank and Longstone Special School.

Notable people 
 Noel Brotherston, former footballer
 Vivian Campbell, guitarist Def Leppard
 Steven Agnew, politician
 Davy Larmour, Crusaders footballer
 Colin Murray, BBC Radio 1 DJ
 Peter and Iris Robinson, politicians
 Chris Walker, Glentoran footballer
 Gemma Garrett Model, former Miss Great Britain and Miss Belfast
 Anne Gregg, BBC presenter and travel writer
 Barry McClements, Commonwealth Games para swimming medallist
 Paddy Wallace, Rugby union footballer
 Micky Modelle, DJ
 Michael Moore, UK politician – Born in town.
 Glenn Ferguson Linfield footballer
 Agnes Romilly White, writer
 George Best, former footballer.

Civil parish of Dundonald
The civil parish contains the settlement of Dundonald.

Townlands
The civil parish contains the following townlands:

Ballybeen
Ballylisbredan
Ballymiscaw
Ballyoran
Ballyrainey
Ballyregan
Carrowreagh
Castlebeg
Church Quarter
Dunlady
Killeen
Unicarval

Gallery

See also
List of civil parishes of County Down

References

External links 

Geography of Belfast
Towns in County Down